Gee Gee may refer to:

 Gee Gee James, African-American actress and singer Regina James (1902 or 1903–1971)
 Gee Gee Bridge, crossing the Wakool River, New South Wales, Australia

See also
 Ottawa Gee-Gees, the athletics teams of the University of Ottawa, Ottawa, Ontario, Canada
 GG (disambiguation)
 Gigi (disambiguation)